Willy Vermeulen (1 September 1919 – 30 November 1956) was a Belgian footballer. He played in two matches for the Belgium national football team from 1946 to 1947.

References

External links
 

1919 births
1956 deaths
Belgian footballers
Belgium international footballers
Place of birth missing
Association football midfielders